The Sturgeon River is a river of Minnesota, United States, located in Saint Louis County.  It flows through Sturgeon Township and French Township, north of Chisholm and Hibbing, and is a tributary of the Little Fork River.

Sturgeon River was so named for its stock of rock sturgeon fish.

See also
List of rivers of Minnesota

References

Minnesota Watersheds
USGS Geographic Names Information Service
USGS Hydrologic Unit Map - State of Minnesota (1974)

Rivers of St. Louis County, Minnesota
Rivers of Minnesota